Let the Games Begin may refer to:

"Let the Games Begin", a song by AJR (band)
"Let the Games Begin", a song by Anarbor from Free Your Mind (EP)
"Let the Games Begin", an episode of the TV series Drive
"Let the Games Begin" (Gilmore Girls)
"Let the Games Begin" (Hercules: The Legendary Journeys)
"Let the Games Begin" (Kid vs. Kat)
"Let the Games Begin" (Under the Dome)